The 2022 FIVB Volleyball Men's World Championship was the 20th staging of the FIVB Volleyball Men's World Championship, contested by the senior men's national teams of the members of the  (FIVB), the sport's global governing body. The tournament was held in Poland and Slovenia from 26 August to 11 September 2022. It was originally planned to be held in Russia. However, due to Russia's invasion of Ukraine starting on 24 February, Russia was stripped of organization rights.

Italy claimed their fourth title, defeating the reigning world champions Poland in four sets. Brazil won the third place match, defeating Slovenia in four sets. Simone Giannelli from Italy was elected the MVP of the tournament, becoming the first setter to win the award since Vyacheslav Zaytsev in 1982.

Host selection
On 15 November 2018, at the FIVB Congress in Cancún, Mexico, FIVB initially announced that the tournament would be held in Russia. The tournament was to take place in ten cities (Moscow, Saint Petersburg, Kaliningrad, Yaroslavl, Kazan, Ufa, Yekaterinburg, Novosibirsk, Kemerovo, and Krasnoyarsk).

On 9 December 2019, the World Anti-Doping Agency initially handed Russia a four-year ban from all major sporting events, after RUSADA was found non-compliant for handing over manipulating lab data to investigators. The WADA ruling allowed athletes who were not involved in the doping or the coverup to compete, but prohibited the use of the Russian flag and anthem at major international sporting events. However, the Russia national team could still enter qualification, as the ban only applies to the final tournament to decide the world champions. The ruling was appealed to the Court of Arbitration for Sport (CAS), which ruled against RUSADA on 17 December 2020, but reduced the ban from four to two years, expiring on 16 December 2022. The CAS ruling also allowed the name "Russia" to be displayed on uniforms, as well as the display of Russian colors, if the words "Neutral Athlete" or "Neutral Team" had equal prominence. As Russia already qualified, its players were unable to use their country's name alone, flag or anthem at the championship, as a result of the two-year ban from world championships in any sport. Russia was scheduled to compete as the Volleyball Federation of Russia (VFR).

Because of the 2022 Russian invasion of Ukraine, Poland, France, Slovenia, as well as the Netherlands threatened to boycott the Championship if Russia were to remain the host. This was confirmed by the Dutch volleyball association on 28 February 2022. Russia was later stripped of its hosting rights on 1 March 2022 due to its invasion.

An accelerated bidding process was opened to determine the new host countries for the tournament. It allowed for the possibility that pool phase could be hosted by two or more countries, up to two hosts in the Round of 16 and quarterfinals, and a single host for the semifinals and final.

On 15 April 2022, FIVB announced that Poland and Slovenia will host the relocated 2022 Men's World Championship.

Qualification

The current world champions Poland automatically qualified for the competition. The top two teams from each of the 2021 Continental Championships secured qualification. The final 12 places were given to top 12 teams as per FIVB World Ranking who have not yet qualified. After Russia was removed from the competition and new hosts Poland and Slovenia had already qualified, Ukraine has been invited in the competition line up as the next highest ranked team in the World Ranking.

Format

Preliminary round
In the first round, the 24 teams were spread across six pools of four teams playing in a single round-robin format. The top two teams in each pool and the top four of the third placed teams qualified for the final round. All results of this round combined in a single ranking table to determine a final round pairing and also 17th to 24th rank in final standing.

Final round
The qualified teams from preliminary round competed in the knock-out stage.

In round of sixteen, the qualified teams matched-up according to the Berger table based on their ranking in the combined ranking table. However, FIVB reserved the first and second position for the host teams if they qualify. The better ranked host team secured the first position, and the worse ranked host team secured the second position. The winners in this round qualified for quarterfinals. The results of this round have combined to preliminary round's combined ranking to determine 9th to 16th rank in final standing. This procedure also applied in quarterfinals to determine 5th to 8th rank in final standing. In semifinals, the winners advanced to compete for the World Championship title. The losers faced each other in the third place match.

Pools composition
The 24 teams were distributed to 6 pools of 4 teams. Teams were seeded in the first position of each pool following the serpentine system according to their FIVB World Ranking as of 20 September 2021. FIVB reserved the right to seed the hosts as head of pool A regardless of the World Ranking. All teams not seeded were drawn to take other available positions in the remaining lines, following the World Ranking. The draw was held at Irina Viner-Usmanova Gymnastics Palace, Moscow, Russia on 30 September 2021. Rankings are shown in brackets except the original hosts who ranked third.

Draw

(*) Replaced after the draw.

Squads

Venues

Pool standing procedure

 Ranking of pool. Only valid to determine ranking position to Round of 16.
 Total number of victories (matches won, matches lost)
 In the event of a tie, the following first tiebreaker will apply: The teams will be ranked by the most point gained per match as follows:
 Match won 3–0 or 3–1: 3 points for the winner, 0 points for the loser
 Match won 3–2: 2 points for the winner, 1 point for the loser
 Match forfeited: 3 points for the winner, 0 points (0–25, 0–25, 0–25) for the loser
 If teams are still tied after examining the number of victories and points gained, then the FIVB will examine the results in order to break the tie in the following order:
 Set quotient: if two or more teams are tied on the number of points gained, they will be ranked by the quotient resulting from the division of the number of all set won by the number of all sets lost.
 Points quotient: if the tie persists based on the set quotient, the teams will be ranked by the quotient resulting from the division of all points scored by the total of points lost during all sets.
 If the tie persists based on the point quotient, the tie will be broken based on the team that won the match of the Round Robin Phase between the tied teams. When the tie in point quotient is between three or more teams, these teams ranked taking into consideration only the matches involving the teams in question.

Preliminary round
All times are Central European Summer Time (UTC+02:00).
The top two teams in each pool and the top four of the third placed teams qualified for the final round.

Pool A

Pool B

Pool C

Pool D

Pool E

Pool F

Combined ranking

Final round
All times are Central European Summer Time (UTC+02:00).

Round of 16
|}

Quarterfinals
|}

Semifinals
|}

3rd place match
|}

Final
|}

Final standing

Source: WCH 2022 final standings

Awards

Most Valuable Player

Best Setter

Best Outside Spikers

Best Opposite Spiker

Best Middle Blockers

Best Libero

Prize money
The champion of the tournament was rewarded with US$200,000. The second place winner received US$125,000 while the third holder received US$75,000. Players selected into Dream Team received US$10,000 each while the MVP was given US$30,000.

Statistics leaders

Statistics leaders correct as of final round.

Broadcasting rights
FIVB, through several companies, sold the broadcasting rights for the 2022 World Championship to the following broadcasters.

The championship was screened through broadcast partnerships covering 90 territories around the world, while Volleyball World TV, Volleyball World's OTT platform, saw over 600,000 unique viewers watch 38.8 million minutes of action during the course of the competition.

See also

2022 FIVB Volleyball Women's World Championship

References

External links
Fédération Internationale de Volleyball 
 
Brackets

 
2022
FIVB World Championship
Volleyball World Championship 2022
World Championship, Men, 2022
World Championship, Men, 2022
2022 in volleyball
2022 in Polish sport
2022 in Slovenian sport
FIVB
FIVB
World Championship, 2022